Papilio tydeus is a species of swallowtail butterfly from the genus Papilio that is found in the Moluccas (Batchian and Gilolo).

Status
Common and not threatened.

Subspecies
Papilio tydeus tydeus (Bachan, Ternate, Halmahera, Morotai)
Papilio tydeus obiensis Rothschild, 1898 (Obi)

Taxonomy
Papilio tydeus is a member of the aegeus  species-group. The clade members are
Papilio aegeus Donovan, 1805 
Papilio bridgei Mathew, 1886
 ? Papilio erskinei Mathew, 1886
Papilio gambrisius Cramer, [1777]
Papilio inopinatus Butler, 1883
Papilio ptolychus Godman & Salvin, 1888
Papilio tydeus C. & R. Felder, 1860
Papilio weymeri Niepelt, 1914
Papilio woodfordi Godman & Salvin, 1888

See also
Wallacea

References

tydeus
Butterflies described in 1860
Butterflies of Indonesia
Taxa named by Baron Cajetan von Felder
Taxa named by Rudolf Felder